Strömvallen is a football stadium in Gävle, Sweden. It was the home ground of Gefle IF until 2015. The stadium holds 6,703 people and was initially opened in 1903, with a dedicated spectator area built in 1923.

References

External links 
Stadium website

Football venues in Sweden
Gefle IF
Sport in Gävle
1995 FIFA Women's World Cup stadiums
Buildings and structures in Gävleborg County
Swedish Bandy Final venues
Sports venues completed in 1903
1903 establishments in Sweden